Carver Middle School might refer to one of several schools:
G.W. Carver Middle School (Miami, Florida)
G.W. Carver Middle School (Richmond, Virginia)
G.W. Carver Middle School (Tulsa, Oklahoma)
Carver Elementary School (Martinsville, Virginia), formerly G.W. Carver Middle School (Martinsville, VA)
Carver Middle High School (Massachusetts), formerly Carver Middle School and Carver High School (Carver, MA)
G.W. Carver Middle School (Meridian, Mississippi)